Nikora Broughton (born 5 September 2001) is a New Zealand rugby union player,  who currently plays as a loose forward for  in New Zealand's domestic National Provincial Championship competition and will play for the  in Super Rugby Pacific from 2023.

Early life and career

Broughton is the son of former  midfield back Norm Broughton (1992–2002, 59 games).

He attended Hato Paora College and is a former player and captain of the college's 1st XV team.
 
After finishing secondary school, Broughton headed to the Bay of Plenty region in the north-east of New Zealand's North Island, where he initially played his club rugby for Arataki Sports Club. On 4 September 2019, he was named in the Bay of Plenty Toa (Under 19) team for that year's Jock Hobbs Memorial National U19 tournament. The following year, then playing his club rugby for the Rangiuru Sports Club, Broughton was again selected for the Bay of Plenty Toa team for a series of games against other provincial under 19 sides.
 
In April 2021, Broughton played for the  Under 20 squad that won the first ever Super Rugby Aotearoa Under 20 tournament that was held in Taupō, after remaining unbeaten in all three rounds. A year later, he again played for the winning and unbeaten team of the tournament, however, this time that was the New Zealand Barbarians Under 21 team. He was one of the stand-outs of his team during the tournament and created a highlight by chipping the ball over his head at 5m from the  Under 20's try line. Barbarians team mate Will Gualter caught the ball and dotted down for a try.

Senior career
 
On 27 July 2021, Broughton was named in the  wider training group for the 2021 Bunnings NPC season. He played his first NPC game for the Steamers on 15 August 2021 against  and scored a try on debut. He played 7 games for Bay of Plenty that first season and was, later that year, named the Bay of Plenty Steamers' "Rookie of the Year" at the province's end-of-year awards function.

As a result of his good performance for Bay of Plenty, Broughton was one of five young players who were invited to train with the  ahead of the 2022 Super Rugby Pacific season. Later in the year, on 26 July 2022, Broughton was named in the Bay of Plenty squad for the 2022 Bunnings NPC season, this time as a full squad member.
 
After another good season playing for Bay of Plenty, Broughton was rewarded with a Super Rugby contract. On 26 October 2022, he was named in the  squad for the 2023 Super Rugby Pacific season.

International career

On 21 September 2018, Broughton – who is of Ngāti Ruanui, Ngā Rauru and Te Āti Haunui-a-Pāpārangi descent – was named in the New Zealand Māori Under 18 team for a two-match series against New Zealand Barbarians Schools and Fiji Schools. A year later, in 2019, he was again named in the New Zealand Māori Under 18 team. The team again played a game against Fiji Schools as well as a game of three halves against New Zealand Schools and New Zealand Barbarians Schools.

Reference list

External links
NZ Rugby History profile
itsrugby.co.uk profile

2001 births
Living people
Ngāti Ruanui people
Ngā Rauru people
Te Āti Haunui-a-Pāpārangi people
People educated at Hato Paora College
New Zealand rugby union players
Rugby union players from Taranaki
Rugby union flankers
Bay of Plenty rugby union players
Highlanders (rugby union) players
People from Patea